Manuel Torres Jiménez (born 5 January 1991) is a Spanish footballer who plays as an attacking midfielder for Polish club Wieczysta Kraków.

He spent most of his professional career in Germany, starting out at Schalke 04's reserves.

Club career
Born in La Algaba, Province of Seville, Andalusia, Torres played youth football with local club Real Betis. His professional input in his homeland consisted of two Segunda División games as a substitute with Villarreal CF's B team, the first being on 27 August 2010 in a 3–0 away loss against Real Valladolid.

In the summer of 2011, 20-year-old Torres moved to Germany and signed for FC Schalke 04, being assigned to the reserve side in Regionalliga West. Two years later, upon expiration of his two-year contract, he joined Karlsruher SC also in the country on a three-year deal. He made his professional debut in German football on 16 August 2013, playing the last minutes of the 1–2 2. Bundesliga home defeat to SpVgg Greuther Fürth. During his spell at the Wildparkstadion he was often deployed as a right winger, and he scored his first league goal for the team on 20 October 2013, contributing to a 2–2 draw at 1. FC Kaiserslautern.

On 9 June 2017, free agent Torres signed with Greuther Fürth for three seasons. He left the club in the following transfer window having failed to find the net and provided one assist, and joined AEL Limassol from the Cypriot First Division.

Torres agreed to a two-year deal at Polish III liga team Wieczysta Kraków on 7 September 2022.

Career statistics

References

External links

1991 births
Living people
People from Vega del Guadalquivir
Sportspeople from the Province of Seville
Spanish footballers
Footballers from Andalusia
Association football midfielders
Segunda División players
Villarreal CF B players
RCD Mallorca B players
2. Bundesliga players
Regionalliga players
FC Schalke 04 II players
Karlsruher SC players
SpVgg Greuther Fürth players
Cypriot First Division players
AEL Limassol players
Spanish expatriate footballers
Expatriate footballers in Germany
Expatriate footballers in Cyprus
Expatriate footballers in Poland
Spanish expatriate sportspeople in Germany
Spanish expatriate sportspeople in Cyprus
Spanish expatriate sportspeople in Poland